Fenvalerate  is a synthetic pyrethroid insecticide.  It is a mixture of four optical isomers which have different insecticidal activities. The 2-S alpha (or SS) configuration, known as esfenvalerate, is the most insecticidally active isomer. Fenvalerate consists of about 23% of this isomer.

Fenvalerate is an insecticide of moderate mammalian toxicity. In laboratory animals, central nervous system toxicity is observed following acute or short-term exposure. Fenvalerate has applications against a wide range of pests including some of the more destructive such as the Helicoverpa assulta. Residue levels are minimized by low application rates. Fenvalerate is most toxic to bees and fish. It is found in some emulsifiable concentrates, ULV, wettable powders, slow release formulations, insecticidal fogs, and granules. It is most commonly used to control insects in food, feed, and cotton products, and for the control of flies and ticks in barns and stables. Fenvalerate does not affect plants, but is active for an extended period of time. 

Fenvalerate may irritate the skin and eyes on contact, and is also harmful if swallowed.

References

External links
 Pyrethrins and Pyrethroids Fact Sheet - National Pesticide Information Center
 Esfenvalerate Pesticide Information Profile - Extension Toxicology Network
 
 WHO fenvalerate fact page

Carboxylate esters
Insecticides
Nitriles
Endocrine disruptors
Chloroarenes
Phenol ethers